QBC can refer to:
Quality Bus Corridor
Quantitative buffy coat, see buffy coat
Bella Coola Airport
Queens Baseball Convention

See also
Pilot report